Odia Ofeimun (born 16 March 1950) is a Nigerian poet and polemicist, the author of many volumes of poetry, books of political essays and on cultural politics, and the editor of two significant anthologies of Nigerian poetry. His work has been widely anthologized and translated and he has read and performed his poetry internationally.

Biography
Odia Ofeimun was born in Iruekpen-Ekpoma, Edo State, Nigeria, in 1950. He worked as a news reporter, factory labourer and civil servant before studying Political Science at the University of Ibadan, where his poetry won first prize in the University Competition of 1975. That year his work appeared in the anthology Poems of Black Africa, edited by Wole Soyinka.

Ofeimun also worked as an administrative officer in the Federal Public Service Commission, as a teacher, as private (political) secretary to Chief Obafemi Awolowo, leader of the Unity Party of Nigeria, and as a member of the editorial board of The Guardian Newspapers in Lagos. He studied at Oxford University on a Commonwealth fellowship. Returning to Nigeria at the annulment of the 1993 election, he wrote columns for The Guardian On Sunday, the Nigerian Tribune, as well as contributing to many other newspapers. He was chairman of the editorial board of the defunct daily, A.M. News, as well as The News and Tempo magazines.

Ofeimun was publicity secretary (1982–84), general secretary (1984–88) and president (1993–97) of the Association of Nigerian Authors. He was also designated advisor to PEN Nigeria Centre and is a founding member of the Pan African Writers' Association.

Ofeimun is the author of more than 40 works. His published collections of poetry include The Poet Lied (1980), A Handle for The Flutist (1986), Dreams At Work and London Letter and Other Poems (2000). His poems for dance drama, Under African Skies (1990) and Siye Goli - A Feast of Return (1992), were commissioned and performed across the UK and Western Europe by Adzido Pan-African Dance Ensemble in the early 1990s, and his most recent poem for dance drama, Nigeria The Beautiful, has been staged through major Nigerian cities to wide acclaim.

Awards
In 2010 Ofeimun received the Fonlon-Nichols Award for literary excellence and propagation of Human Rights, which was conferred on him by the African Literature Association.

Selected bibliography

Poetry
 The Poet Lied (1980)
 A Handle for The Flutist (1986)
 Under African Skies (Lagos: Hornbill House, 1990)
 London Letter and Other Poems (Lagos: Hornbill House, 2000)
 Dreams At Work and Other Poems (Lagos: Hornbill House, 2000)
 A Feast of Return (Lagos: Hornbill House, 2000)
 Go Tell the Generals (2010)
 A Boiling Caracas and Other Poems (2008)
 I Will Ask Questions With Stones If They Take My Voice (2008)
 Nigeria The Beautiful: Poems for Dance Drama (2011)

Anthologies
 Lagos of the Poets
 Salute to the Master Builder

Cultural politics
 A House of Many Mansions (Lagos: Hornbill House,)
 Impossible Dream of the African Author
 Media Nigeriana
 In Search of Ogun: Soyinka In Spite of Nietzsche (Lagos: Hornbill House, 2014)

Politics
 Taking Nigeria Seriously
 June Twelvers' Dilemma
 When Does a Civil War Come To an End?
 This Conference Must Be Different

References

Further reading
 Vicky Sylvester (ed.), Critical perspectives on Odia Ofeimun, Malthouse Press, 2013

External links
 , National Mirror Online, 10 April 2015.
 "ODIA OFEIMUN: Why I quarrelled with Chinweizu", The Sun (Nigeria), 3 January 2015.
  Evelyn Osagie, "Celebrating Ofeimun’s poetics, politics", The Nation, 21 October 2015.

1950 births
Living people
Nigerian male poets
Nigerian essayists
20th-century Nigerian poets
University of Ibadan alumni
20th-century essayists
People from Edo State
Anthologists
20th-century male writers
21st-century male writers
21st-century Nigerian poets